1st NSFC Awards
January 1967

Best Picture: 
 Blow-Up 

The 1st National Society of Film Critics Awards, given by the National Society of Film Critics in January 1967, honored the best in film for 1966.

Winners

Best Picture 
Blow-Up

Best Director 
Michelangelo Antonioni – Blow-Up

Best Actor 
1. Michael Caine – Alfie
2. Richard Burton – Who's Afraid of Virginia Woolf?
2. Max von Sydow – Hawaii
4. Laurence Olivier – Othello
4. Paul Scofield – A Man for All Seasons

Best Actress 
1. Sylvie – The Shameless Old Lady (La vieille dame indigne)
2. Vanessa Redgrave – Morgan!
3. Anouk Aimée – A Man and a Woman (Un homme et une femme)

References

External links
Past Awards

National Society of Film Critics Awards
1966
National Society of Film Critics Awards
National Society of Film Critics Awards